The 2010 Lory Meagher Cup was the 2nd annual fourth-tier hurling competition organised by the Gaelic Athletic Association.  The teams competing were Cavan, Donegal, Fermanagh, Leitrim, Longford, South Down, and Warwickshire.  The 2009 champions, Tyrone were promoted to the 2010 Nicky Rackard Cup, and did not have the opportunity to defend their title. Due to a disagreement over promotion and relegation from the All-Ireland series, no team was relegated from the 2009 Nicky Rackard Cup for the 2010 season.

Structure
The tournament had a double elimination format - each team played at least two games before being knocked out.
One team got a bye to Round 2A.
The other six teams played three Round 1 matches.
The winners in Round 1 advanced to Round 2A.
Two of the Round 1 losers went into Round 2B; one got a bye to the quarter-finals.
There were two Round 2A matches.
The winners in Round 2A advanced to the semi-finals.
The losers in Round 2A went into the quarter-finals.
There was one Round 2B match.
The winner in Round 2B advanced to the quarter-finals.
The loser in Round 2B was eliminated.
There were two quarter-final matches between the Round 2A losers, the Round 2B winner and the Round 1 loser which got a bye.
The winners of the quarter-finals advanced to the semi-finals.
The losers of the quarter-finals were eliminated.
There were two semi-final matches between the Round 2A winners and the quarter-final winners.
The winners of the semi-finals advanced to the final.
The losers of the semi-finals were eliminated.
The winners of the final won the Lory Meagher Cup for 2010.

Fixtures

Round 1

Round 2A

Round 2B

Quarter-finals

Semi-finals

Final

Statistics

Top scorers

Overall

Single game

Scoring
First hat-trick of the competition: J O'Brien for Longford against South Down
Widest winning margin: 17 points
Longford 2-21 - 0-10 Leitrim (Semi-final)
Most goals in a match: 6
Longford 5-13 - 1-13 South Down (Round 2B)
Most points in a match: 34
Longford 2-22 - 2-12 Warwickshire (Quarter-final)
Most goals by one team in a match: 5
Longford 5-13 - 1-13 South Down (Round 2B)
Most goals scored by a losing team: 2
Warwickshire 2-12 - 2-22 Longford (Quarter-final)
Warwickshire 2-09 - 0-21 Donegal (Round 2A)
Most points scored by a losing team: 15
Longford 1-15 - 3-13 Donegal (Round 1)

Lory Meagher Cup
Lory Meagher Cup